The YIMBY movement (short for "yes, in my back yard") is a pro-housing movement in contrast and opposition to the NIMBY ("not in my back yard") phenomenon. The YIMBY position supports increasing the supply of housing within cities where housing costs have escalated to unaffordable levels. YIMBYs often seek rezoning that would allow denser housing to be produced or the repurposing of obsolete buildings, such as shopping malls, into housing. Some YIMBYs have also supported public-interest projects like clean energy or alternative transport.

The YIMBY movement has supporters across the political spectrum including left-leaning adherents who believe housing production is a social justice issue and free-market libertarian proponents who think the supply of housing should not be regulated by the government. YIMBYs argue cities can be made increasingly affordable and accessible by building more infill housing, and that greenhouse gas emissions will be reduced by denser cities.

History
A 1993 essay published in the Journal of the American Planning Association entitled "Planners' Alchemy, Transforming NIMBY to YIMBY: Rethinking NIMBY" used 'YIMBY' in general reference to development, not only housing development.

The pro-housing YIMBY position emerged in regions experiencing unaffordable housing prices. The Guardian and Raidió Teilifís Éireann say this movement began in the San Francisco Bay area in the 2010s due to high housing costs created as a result of the local technology industry adding many more jobs to the region than the number of housing units constructed in the same time span.

Political spectrum
The debate over YIMBY policies does not follow the usual political lines with YIMBYs activists often aligning from all over the political spectrum.

Conversely because "NIMBY" is a pejorative, self-identified NIMBYs are rare, but opposition to YIMBY policies comes from other leftists, right-wing figures like Donald Trump and Tucker Carlson, historical preservationists, local power brokers, wealthy homeowners concerned about their property values, and renter advocates concerned about displacement and gentrification who disagree with the prevailing view among progressive housing economists that displacement is caused by lack of enough housing.

In general, support for development is higher when the development is less local. For example, a statewide upzoning bill will have more popular support statewide than a new apartment building will have from the immediate neighbors. For example, while the national Sierra Club is in favor of infill development, local Sierra Club chapters oppose making development easier in their own cities. According to a 2019 scientific poll conducted by Lake Reach Partners for California YIMBY, in terms of public opinion, support for more infill development is higher among renters, Democrats, and black people, though it enjoys majority support among all groups in California.

The particular contours of housing politics have led to some unusual political bedfellows and accompanying political beliefs. For example, opposition to market-rate housing has been branded as "PHIMBY", for "public housing in my backyard". Similarly, refusal to support any non-subsidized housing or requiring an unrealistically high inclusionary (i.e., subsidized) percentage for new construction has the same result, as subsidized homes are more expensive to build than market-rate ones. The origins of the modern YIMBY movement are separate from pre-existing tenants' rights groups, which are suspicious of their association with young, white technology workers and may be wary of disrupting the status quo, which allows incumbent groups to use discretionary planning processes to negotiate for benefits while slowing development in general. Some have raised concerns about high vacancy rates, citing high vacancy rates even in high-demand cities as a sign that increasing market-rate housing will not improve affordability. There are also concerns that new housing in an expensive city draws more migration than it houses, and will actually worsen the housing crisis via induced demand.

Academic research
Academic research has yielded some generalizable results on the effects of upzoning, the root causes of unaffordability, and the most efficacious policy prescriptions to help low-income workers in prosperous cities.

Housing supply and prices
Studies show that strict land use regulations reduce housing supply and raise the price of houses and land.

Research into the granular effects of additional housing supply show that new housing units in hot markets do not increase nearby rents: the effect on demand pressure is greater than the amenity effect. This has been observed in New York City, in San Francisco, in Helsinki, and across multiple cities. Additionally, in California, new market-rate housing reduced displacement and slowed rises in rent.

Upzoning (rezoning for more housing) in the absence of additional housing production appeared to raise prices in Chicago, though the author disputed that this could lead to general conclusions about the affordability effects of upzoning.

Another study published in Urban Studies in 2006 observed price trends within Canadian cities and noted very slow price drops for older housing over a period of decades; the author concluded that newly constructed housing would not become affordable in the near future, meaning that filtering was not a viable method for producing affordable housing, especially in the most expensive cities.

Affordability and homelessness
The change in rent is inversely proportional to vacancy rates in a city, which are related to the demand for housing and the rate of construction. Homelessness rates are correlated with higher rents, with an inflection point where the median rent passes thirty percent of the median income.

Racial segregation 
Research shows that strict land use regulations contribute to racial housing segregation in the United States. Surveys have shown that white communities are more likely to have strict land use regulations and whites are more likely to support those regulations.

Economy 
A 2019 study by Chang-Tai Hsieh and Enrico Moretti in the American Economic Journal found that liberalization of land use regulations would lead to enormous productivity gains. The study estimated that strict land use regulations "lowered aggregate US growth by 36 percent from 1964 to 2009."

Regional YIMBY Movements

Canada 
In Toronto, a self-styled YIMBY movement was established in 2006 by community members in response to significant development proposals in the West Queen West area, and a YIMBY festival, launched the same year, has been held annually since. The festival's organizer stated that "YIMBYism is a community mindset that's open to change and development." An advocacy group called HousingNowTO fights to maximize the number of homes when the government builds housing. Another group, More Neighbours Toronto (MNTO), advocates for policy changes to increase the housing supply.

In Vancouver, Abundant Housing Vancouver was formed in 2016 to support more housing.

Slovakia 
In 2014, the blog YIMBY Bratislava was created as a response to rising aversion to development in Bratislava, the capital of Slovakia. The blog informs about development in the city, promotes it, but also criticizes it. In 2018 it was renamed to YIM.BA — Yes In My Bratislava. It's a private blog of one author with the fan group of its readers and fans on Facebook.

Sweden 
Yimby is an independent political party network founded in Stockholm in 2007, which advocates physical development, densification and promotion of urban environment with chapters in Stockholm, Gothenburg, and Uppsala. The group believes that the PBL (Plans and Constructions Act, from 1987) is a major impediment to any new construction, and should be eliminated or dramatically reformed.

United Kingdom 
London YIMBY was set up in 2016, publishing its first report with the Adam Smith Institute in 2017 which received national press coverage. Its members advocate a policy termed 'Better Streets'. This proposal would allow residents of individual streets to vote by a two-thirds majority to pick a design code and allow extensions or replacement buildings of up to five or six stories, allowing suburban homes to be gradually replaced by mansion blocks. This flagship policy has achieved a degree of recognition, being endorsed by former Liberal Democrat MP Sam Gyimah and the leader of the House of Commons Jacob Rees-Mogg.

Other YIMBY groups have been set up in individual London boroughs and in cities suffering similar housing shortages, such as Brighton, Bristol and Edinburgh.

Members of the British YIMBY movement have been critical of established planning organisations such as the Town and Country Planning Association and the Campaign to Protect Rural England, accusing them of pursuing policies that worsen Britain's housing shortage.

United States

California
The YIMBY movement has been particularly strong in California, a state experiencing a substantial housing shortage crisis. Since 2017, YIMBY groups in California have pressured California state and its localities to pass laws to expedite housing construction, follow their own zoning laws, and reduce the stringency of zoning regulations. YIMBY activists have also been active in helping to enforce state law on housing by bringing law-breaking cities to the attention of authorities.

Since 2014, in response to California's housing affordability crisis, several YIMBY groups were created in the San Francisco Bay Area. These groups have lobbied both locally and at the state level for increased housing production at all price levels, as well as using California's Housing Accountability Act (the "anti-NIMBY law")  to sue cities when they attempt to block or downsize housing development. The New York Times explained about one organization: "Members want San Francisco and its suburbs to build more of every kind of housing. More subsidized affordable housing, more market-rate rentals, more high-end condominiums."

In 2017, YIMBY groups successfully lobbied for the passage of Senate Bill 35 (SB 35), which streamlines housing under certain criteria, among other "housing package" of bills.

From 2018 to 2020, the lobbying group California YIMBY joined over 100 Bay Area technology industry executives in supporting state senator Scott Wiener's Senate Bills 827 and 50. The bills failed in the state senate after multiple attempts at passage. California YIMBY received $100,000 from Yelp CEO Jeremy Stoppelman, $1 million from Irish entrepreneurs John and Patrick Collison through their company, Stripe, and $500,000 raised by Pantheon Systems CEO Zach Rosen and GitHub CEO Nat Friedman.

YIMBY groups in California have supported the split roll effort to eliminate Proposition 13 protections for commercial properties, and supported the ballot measure known as Proposition 15, which would implement this change but failed to pass in 2020. This change would have potentially incentivized local governments to approve commercial property development (for its attendant business, payroll, sales and property tax revenue) over residential development, while providing a significant new source of funding for localities, mostly earmarked for education.

Massachusetts
Since 2012, several YIMBY groups were established in the greater Boston area. One group argues that "...more smart housing development is the only way to retain a middle class in pricey cities like Boston and Cambridge."

New York
Several YIMBY groups, chiefly Open New York, have been created in New York City; according to an organizer: "In high-opportunity areas where people actually really want to live, the well-heeled, mostly white residents are able to use their perceived political power to stop the construction of basically anything," adding that low-income communities don't share that ability to keep development at bay: "Philosophically, we think that the disproportionate share of the burden of growth has been borne by low income, minority or industrial neighborhoods for far too long.".

In 2011, a news website called `New York YIMBY` was created that focuses on construction trends in New York City. While this news website is not strictly related to YIMBY political movement, in an interview with Politico, the creator of the site stated: "Zoning is the problem, not development in this city. I think people don't really understand that."

International 
In September 2018, the third annual Yes In My Backyard conference, named "YIMBYTown" occurred in Boston, hosted by that area's YIMBY community. The first YIMBY conference was held in 2016 in Boulder, Colorado and hosted by a group that included Boulder's former mayor, who commented that: "It is clearer than ever that if we really care about solving big national issues like inequality and climate change, tackling the lack of housing in thriving urban areas, caused largely by local zoning restrictions, is key." The second annual conference was held in the San Francisco Bay Area city of Oakland, California. These conferences have attracted attendees from the United States, as well as some from Canada, England, Australia, and other countries.

List of North American YIMBY organizations

See also 
 CAVE people
 Drawbridge mentality
 Georgism
 Mixed-use development
 New Urbanism

References

Further reading

External links 
 "The San Francisco activists who say please build in my backyard" on PBS NewsHour
 YIMBY organizations directory

Housing
Political movements
Urban planning